Butland is the surname of the following people:
Bill Butland (1918–1997), American Major League Baseball pitcher 
Henry Butland (1872–1956), New Zelanad rugby union player 
Jack Butland (born 1993), English footballer goalkeeper
Jack Butland (industrialist) (1897–1982), New Zealand food manufacturer knighted in the 1966 New Year Honours
Jeffrey Butland (1950–2004), American politician 
Joanne Butland (born 1978), Australian association football, international rules and Australian rules football player
Steve Butland (born 1941), Canadian politician

See also
Paulger v Butland Industries Ltd, a 1989 court case in New Zealand